Achraf Boudrama (born May 25, 1996 in El Eulma) is an Algerian footballer who plays for Al-Qaisumah FC in the Saudi First Division.

On June 11, 2020, Boudrama signed a two year contract with CA Bizertin.

References

External links
 

1996 births
Living people
Algerian footballers
Algerian Ligue Professionnelle 1 players
Algerian Ligue 2 players
Algerian expatriate sportspeople in Tunisia
Algerian expatriate sportspeople in Saudi Arabia
Al-Qaisumah FC players
CA Bizertin players
Expatriate footballers in Tunisia
Expatriate footballers in Saudi Arabia
ES Sétif players
MC El Eulma players
JSM Skikda players
Tunisian Ligue Professionnelle 1 players